Humbach is a river of Thuringia, Germany.

The Humbach springs northwest of Hümpfershausen.

See also
List of rivers of Thuringia

References

Rivers of Thuringia
Rivers of Germany